Francisca Herrera Garrido (1869 – 4 November 1950) was a Galician writer of poems and novels.

Biography
Born in La Coruña to a wealthy Galician aristocratic family, she lived in Madrid during most of her life. Though she wrote primarily in Galician, she also wrote in Spanish. A contemporary of Sofía Casanova, it was Rosalía de Castro who served as Herrera Garrido's literary model. Conservative and antifeminist, Herrera Garrido was "one of the first women to publish narrative in Galician". She was the first woman elected as a permanent member of the Royal Galician Academy, and was honored on Galician Literature Day in 1987.

Selected works 

 Sorrisas e bágoas, 1913
 Almas de muller...¡volallas na luz!, 1915
 Frores do noso paxareco, 1919
 Néveda, 1920
 A ialma de Mingos, 1922
 Pepiña, 1922 
 Martes de Antroido, 1925 
 Réproba, 1925
 A neta de naipera, 1925
 Familia de lobos, 1928

References

1869 births
1950 deaths
People from A Coruña
Galician-language writers
Spanish women poets
Spanish women novelists
20th-century Spanish poets
20th-century Spanish women writers